Mr. Sahil Babayev is the Minister of Labour and Social Protection of Population of the Republic of Azerbaijan.

Biography 
Born in 1980 in Baku Sahil Babayev graduated from Baku State University in the field of International Law and International Relations with a Bachelor's degree (2000), a Master's degree with honors (2002), and a PhD in Law (2010). He is fluent in English, Russian and Turkish languages and has a good command of French. 
He is a member of the New Azerbaijan Party.

Career 
 From 1999 to 2006, Mr. Babayev worked as a senior specialist and subsequently as the Head of the Foreign Investments Department at the State Oil Company of the Republic of Azerbaijan (SOCAR).. During this tenure, he participated in the drafting of Production Sharing Agreements, the Shah Deniz natural gas sales agreements, as well as Baku-Tbilisi-Ceyhan and Baku-Tbilisi-Erzurum pipeline midstream contracts.

 From 2006 to 2009 he served as an Assistant to the Deputy Chairman of the Milli Mejlis (The Parliament) of the Republic of Azerbaijan and was the coordinator of the EU-Azerbaijan Parliamentary Cooperation Committee and the Committee on Natural Resources, Energy and Environment.

 From 2009, Mr. Babayev worked as the Head of the Foreign Investments and Aid Coordination Department of the Ministry of Economic Development and from 2011 as the Head of the Department for Cooperation with International Organizations.

   At the same time, he was the Chairman of the Supervisory Board of Tamiz Shahar (Clean City) JSC  in 2009-2014, co-chaired the EU-Azerbaijan sub-committee on trade and economy, headed the Program Management Unit for European Union Assistance Instruments, and was a member of the Board of Directors of SOCAR Turkey Aegean Oil Refinery project.

	On March 13, 2014, Mr. Babayev was appointed Deputy Minister of Economy and Industry by the Order of the President of the Republic of Azerbaijan and was re-appointed to the same role on January 30, 2016. During this period, among other activities, he was a curator of foreign economic policy and trade missions, Export and Investment Promotion Foundation (AZPROMO), the Coordinating Council on Transit Freight, the representative of the Ministry of Economy in the Southern Gas Corridor project, the Chairman of the Supervisory Board of AzerGold CJSC, a member of the Supervisory Board of International Bank of Azerbaijan as well as the Board of Directors of SOCAR Turkey Aegean Oil Refining Complex (the STAR project).
	He was a co-chairman of the Intergovernmental Commissions with Germany, Czech Republic, Slovenia, Argentina and Brazil, co-chairman of the Azerbaijan-Iran Working Group on Financing the Resht-Astara Section of the North-South Corridor, and member of intergovernmental commissions with 19 countries.
	By the Decree of the President of the Republic of Azerbaijan, dated April 21, 2018, he was appointed Minister of Labour and Social Protection of Population of the Republic of Azerbaijan. 
	In addition, Mr. Babayev heads intergovernmental commissions with Hungary, Serbia, Montenegro and Romania.

Scientific activity 
He was a substitute teacher of the International Law Department at Baku State University, a lecturer at Azerbaijan Diplomatic Academy, participated in various trainings and courses in the field of international and contract law in England, France and other countries. He is the author of dissertations and monographs on international oil agreements, Production Sharing Agreements, international and national legal regulation, international legal process, and international judicial procedures. At the same time, he is the chairman of the "Commercial Law" state examination commission at the Faculty of Law of Baku State University.

Family 
He is married with three children

References 

Azerbaijani politicians
1980 births
Living people